Redfield is a surname. Notable people with the name include:

 Alfred C. Redfield (1890–1983), American oceanographer
 Edward Willis Redfield (1869–1965), American painter
 Heman J. Redfield (1788–1877), American politician from New York
 J. Howard Redfield (1879–1944), American mathematician
 James Redfield (born 1950), American novelist
 James M. Redfield (born 1935), American classical scholar
 Joe Redfield (born 1961), Major League Baseball third baseman
 John Howard Redfield (1815–1895), American botanist and conchologist
 Liza Redfield (1924–2018), American conductor, pianist, and composer
 Luke Redfield (born 1983), American indie folk singer-songwriter
 Pam Redfield (born 1948), American politician from Nebraska
 Robert Redfield (1897–1958), American anthropologist
 Robert R. Redfield (born 1951), American virologist and medical researcher
 William Redfield (disambiguation), multiple people, including:
William C. Redfield (1858–1932), American politician, first U.S. Secretary of Commerce
William Charles Redfield (1789–1857), American meteorologist
William Redfield (actor) (1927–1976), American actor

Fictional characters
 Chris and Claire Redfield, fictional characters from the Resident Evil science fiction series of video games

See also 
 Redfield (disambiguation)